Pythio railway station is a railway station and junction where the railway to Ormenio and Bulgaria branches off the main line from Thessaloniki to Istanbul through Alexandroupoli and Uzunköprü, that serves the village of Pythio, Evros in Eastern Macedonia and Thrace, Greece. Located southeast of the village of Pythio, it is unmanned, however there are waiting rooms available, if in a dilapidated state. The station is the final stop in Greece before crossing the border into Turkey. There is another railway stop closer to the village,  ("Pythio halt").

History
The station lies on the line, built by the Chemins de fer Orientaux (CO) from Istanbul to Vienna. The railway reached Pythio, known as Kuleliburgaz during Ottoman rule, in 1873, when the line from Istanbul to Edirne and Bulgaria was opened.  A 112 km branch from Pythio to Alexandroupoli (then known as Dedeağaç) was opened in 1874.

When the railway was built, it was all within the Ottoman Empire. During World War I, the railway was an important link for the transportation of troops and equipment, as the Ottoman Empire, Bulgaria, and Austria-Hungary were all Central Allies. On 14 December 1916 Allied, aircrafe bombed the bridge over the river Evros near Pythio (Kuleliburgaz). Under the Treaty of Lausanne of 1923, a new border between Greece and Turkey was established at the Evros river, just east of Pythio, which had the result that the railway from Istanbul to Bulgaria entered Greece at Pythio, then re-entered Turkey at Edirne (Karaağaç railway station), re-entered Greece at Marasia, and finally entered Bulgaria between Ormenio and Svilengrad. This arrangement continued until 1971, when two new lines were opened.

During the occupation (and especially during German withdrawal in 1944), the network was severely damaged by both the German army and Greek resistance groups. The track and rolling stock replacement took time following the civil war, with normal service levels resumed around 1948. In 1970 OSE became the legal successor to the SEK, taking over responsibilities for most of Greece's rail infrastructure. On 1 January 1971, the station and most of the Greek rail infrastructure was transferred to the Hellenic Railways Organisation S.A., a state-owned corporation. Freight traffic declined sharply when the state-imposed monopoly of OSE for the transport of agricultural products and fertilisers ended in the early 1990s. Many small stations of the network with little passenger traffic were closed down. That same year in Turkey, the Edirne Cut-off was opened to allow trains from Istanbul to Bulgaria to run through Edirne entirely on Turkish territory so that trains such as the Orient Express no longer had to stop at Pythio. In Greece, a line was opened to allow trains from Pythio to Bulgaria to stay on Greek territory and avoid Edirne. In the 1990s, OSE introduced the InterCity service to the Alexandroupoli–Svilengrad line Which reduced travel times across the whole line.

In 2001 the infrastructure element of OSE was created, known as GAIAOSE; it would henceforth be responsible for the maintenance of stations, bridges and other elements of the network, as well as the leasing and the sale of railway assists. In 2005, TrainOSE was created as a brand within OSE to concentrate on rail services and passenger interface. In 2009, with the Greek debt crisis unfolding OSE's Management was forced to reduce services across the network. Timetables were cutback and routes closed, as the government-run entity attempted to reduce overheads.On 11 February 2011, all cross border routes were closed and international services (to Istanbul, Sofia, etc.) were ended. Services to/from Ormenio were replaced by bus. In 2014 TrainOSE replaced services to/from Dikaia with buses

In 2014 TrainOSE replaced services to/from Dikaia with buses In 2017 OSE's passenger transport sector was privatised as TrainOSE, currently, a wholly-owned subsidiary of Ferrovie dello Stato Italiane infrastructure, including stations, remained under the control of OSE. In 2019 services were suspended due to a landslide. In September 2022, reguler crossbourder transport resumed

Facilities
The station buildings are a beautiful example of late 19th-century railway architecture In September 2022, regular cross-border transport resumed  The buildings neglected for years  have been upgraded and restored, with disabled access at platform level.

Services
Pythio is the first European Union railway station for trains from Turkey and passengers from the East. , the station is only served by one daily pair of regional trains Alexandroupoli–Ormenio

Between July 2005 and February 2011 the Friendship Express (an international InterCity train jointly operated by the Turkish State Railways (TCDD) and TrainOSE linking Istanbul's Sirkeci Terminal, Turkey and Thessaloniki, Greece) passed through Pythio, with trains changing locomotives and crew at the station.

References

Railway stations in Eastern Macedonia and Thrace
Railway stations opened in the 1870s
Greece–Turkey border crossings
Buildings and structures in Evros (regional unit)